Tostada may refer to:

Tostada (toast), a Latin American toast
Tostada (tortilla), a Mexican fried tortilla and the dish based on it

See also
Tostado (disambiguation)